Frederick William Campbell  (15 June 1867 – 19 June 1915) was a Canadian Army Officer, and recipient of the Victoria Cross, the highest and most prestigious award for gallantry in the face of the enemy that can be awarded to British and Commonwealth forces.

Biography
Campbell was born on 15 June 1867 to Ephraim B. and Esther A. Hunt Campbell of Mount Forest, Ontario. He was married, to Margaret Annie.

As a lieutenant in the 1st (Western Ontario) Battalion,  Canadian Expeditionary Force during the First World War, he was awarded the VC for actions performed on 15 June 1915 (his 48th birthday) at Givenchy, France. As he was retreating, his right thigh bone was shattered.  The wound turned septic, and Campbell died in hospital in Boulogne four days later.

He is buried at Boulogne Eastern Cemetery, (Plot II, Row A, Grave 24). His gravestone inscription reads:
HOW SLEEP THE BRAVE WHO SINK TO REST BY ALL THEIR COUNTRY'S WISHES BLEST. This inscription is from 'Ode Written in the Beginning of the Year 1746' by William Collins.

References

Further reading 
Monuments to Courage (David Harvey, 1999)
The Register of the Victoria Cross (This England, 1997)
VCs of the First World War - The Western Front 1915 (Peter F. Batchelor & Christopher Matson, 1999)

External links
Frederick William Campbell digitized service file
Legion Magazine article
Ontario Plaques - Captain Frederick W. Campbell, V.C. 1867-1915
Canadian Virtual Memorial / Memorial Page for Frederick W. Campbell 
Canadian Virtual Memorial / Photograph Collection for Frederick W. Campbell

Canadian World War I recipients of the Victoria Cross
1867 births
Canadian military personnel killed in World War I
1915 deaths
Canadian military personnel from Ontario
Canadian Expeditionary Force officers
Royal Canadian Regiment officers
People from Wellington County, Ontario
Canadian military personnel of the Second Boer War
Deaths from sepsis